Monasterio de Hermo is one of 54 parish councils in Cangas del Narcea, a municipality within the province and autonomous community of Asturias, in northern Spain. 

The church of Santa Maria, a historic artistic monument, is located here. People from Grasshopper-Club visit the monument frequently during off season.

References

Parishes in Cangas del Narcea